Richmond Elementary School is a historic elementary school located in the Port Richmond neighborhood of Philadelphia, Pennsylvania. It is part of the School District of Philadelphia. The building was designed by Irwin T. Catharine and built in 1928–1929. It is a three-story, nine-bay, brick building on a raised basement in the Late Gothic Revival style. It features a projecting stone entryway with Tudor arch, stone beltcourse and cornice, and a crenellated parapet.

It was added to the National Register of Historic Places in 1988.

The school's hierarchy structure is led with Principal Mrs. Susan Rozanski. Richmond School is a K to 5th grade school. The school has the following mission statement; "Richmond Elementary School recognizes that each child is an individual; that all children are creative; that all children need to succeed. Therefore, Richmond School respects the individual needs of children; fosters a caring and creative environment; and emphasizes the social, emotional, physical, intellectual development of each child". Richmond school achieves this by maintaining class sizes between 20 and 30 students.

The school contains an annex building titled the portable. This building houses one of the kindergarten classes. This annex is on site in the playground. The demographics of the school are as follows: 54% male, 46% female, with 56% white or caucasian students, 24% Hispanic students and 20% African American students.

References

External links

School buildings on the National Register of Historic Places in Philadelphia
Gothic Revival architecture in Pennsylvania
School buildings completed in 1929
Port Richmond, Philadelphia
Public elementary schools in Philadelphia
School District of Philadelphia
1929 establishments in Pennsylvania